The Taiwan Times is a newspaper based in Taiwan. The newspaper began publishing on 25 August 1971. Wang Hsing-ching worked as one of its notable reporters.

See also

 List of newspapers in Taiwan

External links

  

Chinese-language newspapers (Traditional Chinese)
Newspapers published in Taiwan
Newspapers established in 1971
1971 establishments in Taiwan